Carol Frances Beerwinkel is a South African politician who served as a Member of the Western Cape Provincial Parliament from May 2009 until May 2019. Beerwinkel is a member of the African National Congress.

Western Cape Provincial Parliament
Beerwinkel is a member of the African National Congress. She was elected to the Western Cape Provincial Parliament in the 2009 election. She took office on 6 May 2009.

Beerwinkel was re-elected for a second term as a provincial parliamentarian in the 2014 provincial election. She left the provincial parliament on 7 May 2019, as she was not placed on the ANC's list for that year's provincial election.

References

External links
Archived profile at Western Cape Provincial Parliament

Living people
Year of birth missing (living people)
Members of the Western Cape Provincial Parliament
African National Congress politicians
21st-century South African politicians
21st-century South African women politicians
People from Cape Town
Coloured South African people
Women members of provincial legislatures of South Africa